
Gmina Kamieńsk is an urban-rural gmina (administrative district) in Radomsko County, Łódź Voivodeship, in central Poland.

Villages
Apart from the town of Kamieńsk, Gmina Kamieńsk contains the villages and settlements of Aleksandrów, Barczkowice, Dąbrowa, Danielów, Gałkowice Nowe, Gałkowice Stare, Gorzędów, Huby Ruszczyńskie, Huta Porajska, Kolonia Olszowiec, Koźniewice, Michałów, Napoleonów, Ochocice, Ozga, Podjezioro, Pytowice, Ruszczyn, Siódemka, Szpinalów and Włodzimierz.

Neighbouring gminas
Gmina Kamieńsk is bordered by the gminas of Bełchatów, Dobryszyce, Gomunice, Gorzkowice, Kleszczów, Rozprza and Wola Krzysztoporska.

References
Polish official population figures 2006

Kamiensk
Radomsko County